Lord Wellington was launched in 1809 at Shields. She initially sailed as a London-based transport and then made two voyages to India, and one to Mauritius. Thereafter she traded widely until she was condemned c.1842.

Career
Lord Wellington first appeared in the Register of Shipping (RS) in 1810 with Hunter, master, Bulmer & Co., owner, and trade Shields–London. Lloyd's Register (LR) for 1811 showed her with R.Gallilee, master, Bulmer, owner, and trade London transport.

In 1813 the EIC lost its monopoly on the trade between India and Britain. British ships were then free to sail to India or the Indian Ocean under a license from the EIC.

Captain W.H. Harris sailed Lord Wellington to Bombay in August 1816, and again on 5 November 1818. In 1820 he sailed her to Île de France.

Fate
The entry for Lord Wellington in LR for 1842 carries the annotation "Condemned".

Citations and references
Citations

References

1809 ships
Age of Sail merchant ships of England